Wieambilla is a rural locality in the Western Downs Region, Queensland, Australia. This locality and its surroundings are extensively used for coal seam gas harvesting.

History 
The locality takes its name from the name of a parish, which in turn was named after a pastoral run operated by Charles George Temple Chauvel in the 1850s, which may have been named after the Wieambilla Creek.

Wieambilla Sawmills Provisional School opened in 1915 and closed circa 1926.

Shootings 

Constables Matthew Arnold and Rachel McCrow, and a neighbour, Alan Dare, were murdered on 12 December 2022 at a rural property in Wieambilla. The perpetrators, brothers Gareth and Nathaniel Train, and Gareth’s wife, Stacey Train, were later shot and killed by Queensland police. Gareth was a known conspiracy theorist who alleged the Port Arthur massacre was a false flag operation and that Princess Diana was killed in a 'blood sacrifice'. Nathaniel was a former school principal.

References 

Western Downs Region
Localities in Queensland